Victor António Rafael de Carvalho (born 20 February 1969) is a retired Angolan basketball player. He competed internationally with Angola at the Summer Olympics from 1992 to 2004. In 14 games, he averaged 9 points per game. He is from Luanda.

References

External links
 

1969 births
Living people
Angolan men's basketball players
1990 FIBA World Championship players
Basketball players at the 1992 Summer Olympics
Basketball players at the 1996 Summer Olympics
Basketball players at the 2000 Summer Olympics
Basketball players at the 2004 Summer Olympics
Atlético Petróleos de Luanda basketball players
Olympic basketball players of Angola
Shooting guards
Basketball players from Luanda
2006 FIBA World Championship players
2002 FIBA World Championship players
1994 FIBA World Championship players